Ryan Ward may refer to:

 Ryan Ward (actor), Canadian actor
 Ryan Ward (baseball), professional baseball player
 Ryan Ward (gymnast) (born 1989), American acrobatic gymnast
 Ryan Ward (lacrosse) (born 1980), Canadian lacrosse player
 Ryan Henry Ward, American artist
Ryan Zachary Ward, actor in Naomi and Ely's No Kiss List